HCL AppScan, previously known as IBM AppScan, is a family of desktop and web security testing and monitoring tools, formerly a part of the Rational Software division of IBM. In July 2019, the product was acquired by HCL Technologies and is currently marketed under HCL Software, a product development division of HCL Technologies. AppScan is intended to test both on-premise and web applications for security vulnerabilities during the development process, when it is least expensive to fix such problems. The product scans the behavior of each application, whether an off-the-shelf application or internally developed, and develops a program intended to test all of its functions for both common and application-specific vulnerabilities. This family of products is capable of performing SAST, DAST, IAST and Mobile Analysis against the user's source code and check for vulnerabilities.

History
AppScan was originally developed by Israeli software company Sanctum Ltd. (formerly Perfecto Technologies) and was first released in 1998. A year later, Sanctum expanded its web security bundle and launched an Application firewall, called AppShield. The first version of AppShield was developed by a team led by Gili Raanan, and was running on a dedicated Linux server.

AppScan version 2.0 was released in February 2001, adding policy recognition engine and knowledge database, an automatic and customizable crawler engine and attack simulator. Version 3 was released in April 2002, adding collaborative testing capabilities, where different tasks can be assigned to different testers; and a number of user interface enhancements in both the scanning and reporting sections of the program. By 2003 AppScan was used by over 500 enterprise customers and had revenues close to 30 million dollars.

In July 2004, Sanctum was acquired by Massachusetts based company Watchfire, which developed a web applications management platform named WebXM. AppScan became Watchfire's flagship product and Sanctum's R&D center in Herzliya, Israel, became Watchfire's main R&D location.

In June 2007, Watchfire was acquired by IBM and incorporated into the Rational Software product line, enabling IBM to cover more of the application development lifecycle; with the addition of a new tool to help developers further bolster the security of the application itself. Watchfire R&D center was incorporated into IBM R&D Labs in Israel.

In 2009 IBM acquired Ounce Labs and added yet another tool to AppScan to find and correct vulnerabilities in software source code. This new version was quickly re-packaged as a separate edition of AppScan: AppScan Source Edition.

In June 2019, HCL acquired select IBM collaboration, commerce, digital experience, AppScan and BigFix solutions.

Editions
 AppScan Enterprise Edition - Client-server version used to scale security testing.
 AppScan Standard Edition  - Desktop software for automated Web application security testing environment for IT Security, auditors, and penetration testers.
 AppScan Source Edition - Prevent data breaches by locating security flaws in the source code.
 AppScan on Cloud - Application Security Testing suite as a service.

References

External links
HCL AppScan Standard web page
HCL AppScan Enterprise web page
HCL AppScan on Cloud web page
HCL AppScan Source web page

Software testing
Divested IBM products